Aniek van Koot defeated the two-time defending champion Diede de Groot in the final, 6–4, 4–6, 7–5 to win the ladies' singles wheelchair tennis title at the 2019 Wimbledon Championships. It was de Groot's only loss at the majors that year, preventing her from achieving the Grand Slam.

Seeds

Draw

Finals

References
WC Women's Singles

Women's Wheelchair Singles
Wimbledon Championship by year – Wheelchair women's singles